The William and Catherine Biggs Farm is a historic home and farm complex located at Detour, Carroll County, Maryland, United States. The complex consists of a stone house, a stone outbuilding / summer kitchen, a frame bank barn, and an early-20th-century concrete block barn, dairy building, and silo. The house is a two-story, five-by-two-bay structure with a three-by-two-bay, two-story rear wing. It is built primarily of rubble stone.

The William and Catherine Biggs Farm was listed on the National Register of Historic Places in 2001.

References

External links
, including photo in 2000, at Maryland Historical Trust

Farms on the National Register of Historic Places in Maryland
Houses in Carroll County, Maryland
Houses completed in 1793
Art Deco architecture in Maryland
National Register of Historic Places in Carroll County, Maryland